Yuri Soloviev (or Yury or Solovyov) may refer to the following Russian people:
Yuri Soloviev (banker) (born 1970)
Yuri Soloviev (dancer) (1940–1977), ballet dancer
Yuri Khanon (born Yuri Soloviev-Savoyarov in 1965), composer